Ansley Jansze (born 12 February 1986) is a Sri Lankan cricketer. He made his first-class debut for Chilaw Marians Cricket Club in the 2007–08 Premier Trophy on 21 February 2008.

See also
 List of Chilaw Marians Cricket Club players

References

External links
 

1986 births
Living people
Sri Lankan cricketers
Chilaw Marians Cricket Club cricketers
Place of birth missing (living people)